Samantha oups! is a French sketch comedy series that was broadcast on France 2 from 2004 to 2007.

The series deals with the life of a blonde young woman, Samantha Lo, and her brunette friend, Chantal Matieu. As part of the comedic nature of the series, the roles are played by men, with David Strajmayster (credited as "Doudi") playing Samantha, and Guillaume Carcaud ("Pepess") starring as Chantal; Carcaud also plays various minor male and female roles in the show.

Format

The series is presented in a "shortcom" (short sitcom) format, with each episode generally running for approximately 5 minutes each.

Early episodes in the series featured Samantha and Chantal attempting various activities or careers, with varying, comedic results; these most-often feature Samantha in many aspects of a given subject or career—for example, in an episode focused on a supermarket, Samantha is portrayed as a shopper, a stockperson and a cashier; another example, which featured Samantha in court, portrayed her as a judge, a stenographer, an attorney, a plaintiff, a defendant and a spectator. Many of these episodes were taped in and around Paris, with some episodes shot on location in other parts of France. The series also featured a 12-part episode, which featured Samantha and Chantal on vacation in Marrakech, Morocco over Christmas and Réveillon. Samantha also has a crush on notable television host Jean-Luc Delarue; in one episode, Samantha and Chantal break into a TV studio in an attempt to meet Delarue face-to-face.

The show's final season (2006-2007) take place in Samantha's cottage ("gîte"), which her aunt, "Grande Tata Lo", has owned. Following the introduction of the gîte format, recurring characters were added, which bend towards the absurd—featured characters, all played by other actors, include Simon, the troubled writer; Annabelle, the awkward businesswoman; Baul, the postman who reads other people's mail; hunters Gontrand and Ademar; and Daniel, a professor. The gîte episodes also included special guests, either playing themselves or other characters—notable guests included Stéphane Bern, Olivier Minne and Jean-Marc Morandini.

Production
The series was in production from 2004 to 2007; production ended when Strajmayster announced that a film based on the series is being produced. However, since the close of production of the series, no film was made, and Strajmayster and Carcaud have since moved on to other series.

The series was produced with funding from the CNC.

Broadcast
The series was first broadcast on France 2 from 2004 to 2007 in two-episode blocks weekdays at 7:50PM, before France 2's evening 8PM newscast, Journal de 20 heures; the series is still broadcast in repeats on France 4, Game One and Canal J, often seen in three-episode blocks.

The series also was seen in Belgium on Club RTL, and in Canada on Vrak.TV (where it is broadcast as Samantha).

Franco-Belgian broadcaster RTBF holds Region 2 DVD distribution rights in Belgium. In Canada (Region 1), DVD releases are distributed through DEP Distribution.

Cast
 David Strajmayster ("Doudi"): Samantha Lo
 Guillaume Carcaud ("Pepess"): Chantal Matieu; miscellaneous characters

Supporting cast
Added after the introduction of the "gîte" format
 Vincent Jaspard: Le Maire (The Mayor)
 Julien Cafaro: Baul
 Marie-Laure Descoureaux: Annabelle Delarinatonière
 Philippe Spiteri: Simon Quewa
 Philippe Vieux: Gontrand
 Eric Bougnon: Adémar
 Pierre-Yves le Louarn: Daniel
 Solange Milhaud: Consuella
 Lee Delong: Aniesca

Accolades

See also
 List of Samantha oups! episodes

References

External links 
   (via archive.org)
 Site officiel sur Hypnoweb 
 Site officiel sur France 2 
 Site officiel sur France 4 
 Site officiel sur Vrak.tv 
 

2004 French television series debuts
2007 French television series endings
France Télévisions television comedy
French television sketch shows
Cross-dressing in television